Eugène Brieux (19 January 18586 December 1932), French dramatist, was born in Paris of poor parents.

Biography

Works
A one-act play, Bernard Palissy, written in collaboration with M. Gaston Salandri, was produced in 1879, but he had to wait eleven years before he obtained another hearing, his Ménage d'artistes being produced by André Antoine at the Théâtre Libre in 1890.

His plays are essentially didactic, being aimed at some weakness or iniquity of the social system. Blanchette (1892) pointed out the civic results of the education of girls of the working classes; Monsieur de Réboval (1892) was directed against pharisaism; L'Engrenage (1894) against corruption in politics; Les Bienfaiteurs (1896) against the frivolity of fashionable charity; and L'Évasion (1896) satirized an indiscriminate belief in the doctrine of heredity.

Les trois filles de M. Dupont  (1897) is a powerful, somewhat brutal, study of the miseries imposed on poor middle-class girls by the French system of dowry; Le Résultat des courses (1898) shows the evil results of betting among the Parisian workmen; La Robe rouge (1900) was directed against the injustices of the law; Les Remplaçantes (1901) against the practice of putting children out to nurse.

Les Avariés (1901), Damaged Lives in English, was banned by the censor, due to its medical details of syphilis, was read privately by the author at the Théâtre Antoine. It tells how a young lawyer infected with syphilis declines his physician's advice to take a long course of mercurial treatment and postpone his marriage. It was dedicated to Jean Alfred Fournier, Europe's foremost expert on syphilis.

Petite amie (1902) describes the life of a Parisian shop-girl.
Later plays are La Couvée (1903, acted privately at Rouen in 1893), Maternité (1904), La Déserteuse (1904), in collaboration with M. Jean Sigaux, and Les Hannetons, a comedy in three acts (1906).

Brieux wrote four more plays in the ensuing decade. The first was La Foi, for which
Camille Saint-Saëns wrote incidental music in 1909. It was presented in Monte Carlo on 10 April, and at Her Majesty's Theatre, London, on 20 September. This was followed by La Femme Seule (1913), Le Bourgeois aux champs (1914), and Les Américains chez nous (1920). He also wrote some travelogues: Voyages aux Indes et à Indo-Chine (1910) and Au Japon par Java, la Chine, la Corée (1914). He also wrote wartime pamphlets, paying special attention to the care of those blinded by their wounds.

Eugène Brieux died in 1932 and was interred in the Cimetière du Grand Jas in Cannes on the French Riviera.

FilmographyDamaged Goods, directed by Tom Ricketts (1914, based on the play Les Avariés)Die Geißel der Menschheit, directed by Luise Kolm and Jacob Fleck (1918, based on the play Les Avariés)Simone, directed by Camille de Morlhon (1918, based on the play Simone)A Métely, directed by Mihály Fekete (1918, based on the play Les Avariés)Damaged Goods, directed by Alexander Butler (1919, based on the play Les Avariés), directed by René Hervil (1921, based on the play Blanchette)The Cradle, directed by Paul Powell (1922, based on the play Le Berceau)L'Avocat, directed by Gaston Ravel (1925, based on the play L'Avocat)Simone, directed by Émile-Bernard Donatien (1926, based on the play Simone)Damaged Lives, directed by Edgar G. Ulmer (1933, based on the play Les Avariés)The Red Robe, directed by Jean de Marguenat (1933, based on the play La Robe rouge), directed by Pierre Caron (1937, based on the play Blanchette)Damaged Goods, directed by Phil Goldstone (1937, based on the play Les Avariés), directed by Robert Péguy (1943, based on the play L'Avocat'')

References

External links
 
 

Writers from Paris
1858 births
1932 deaths
19th-century French dramatists and playwrights
Burials at the Cimetière du Grand Jas
Members of the Académie Française
20th-century French dramatists and playwrights